Alexander Gordon "Sandy" McKay,  (December 24, 1924 – August 31, 2007) was a Canadian academic who specialized in Vergilian studies.

Born in Toronto, Ontario, McKay graduated from Upper Canada College in 1942. He received a Bachelor of Arts degree in 1946 from the University of Toronto, a Master of Arts degree in 1947 from Yale University, a A.M. degree in 1948 from Princeton University and a Ph.D in 1950 from Princeton. He started his academic career as an instructor at Princeton University from 1947 to 1949. He then taught at Wells College (1949-1950), the University of Pennsylvania (1950-1951), the University of Manitoba (1951-1952), Mount Allison University (1952-1953), Waterloo College (1953-1955), and again at the University of Manitoba (1955-1957).

He started teaching at McMaster University in 1957. He was appointed an Associate Professor in 1959, a full professor in 1961, and retired as a Professor Emeritus in 1990. He was chair of Classics from 1962–68 and from 1976-79. From 1968 to 1973, he was the founding dean of the Faculty of Humanities.

He was president of the Royal Society of Canada from 1984 to 1987.

After his retirement from McMaster University in 1990, he taught at York University in Toronto as Adjunct Professor of Humanities from 1990 until 1996.

Honours
In 1965, he was made a Fellow of the Royal Society of Canada. He was a recipient of the Queen Elizabeth II Silver Jubilee Medal, the Canadian Centennial Medal, and the 125th Anniversary of the Confederation of Canada Medal. In 1988, he was made an Officer of the Order of Canada in recognition for being a "distinguished scholar, educator and humanitarian". He received honorary degrees from the University of Manitoba (1986), Brock University (1990), Queen's University (1991), McMaster University (1992), and the University of Waterloo (1993).

Selected works
 Naples and Campania, 1962
 Victorian Architecture in Hamilton, 1967
 Vergil's Italy, 1970
 Ancient Campania, Vols. I and II, 1972
 Houses, Villas, and Palaces in the Roman World, 1975
 Vitruvius, Architect and Engineer, 1978
 Römische Häuser, Villen, und Paläste, 1980
 Roma Antiqua, Latium & Etruria, 1986

References

External links
 

1924 births
2007 deaths
Canadian university and college faculty deans
Academic staff of McMaster University
Officers of the Order of Canada
People from Toronto
Princeton University alumni
University of Toronto alumni
Upper Canada College alumni
Yale University alumni
Wells College faculty
Canadian expatriates in the United States